On, on, or ON may refer to:

Arts and entertainment

Music
 On (band), a solo project of Ken Andrews
 On (EP), a 1993 EP by Aphex Twin
 On (Echobelly album), 1995
 On (Gary Glitter album), 2001
 On (Imperial Teen album), 2002
 On (Elisa album), 2006
 On (Jean album), 2006
 On (Boom Boom Satellites album), 2006
 On (Tau album), 2017
 "On" (song), a 2020 song by BTS
 "On", a song by Bloc Party from the 2006 album A Weekend in the City

Other media
 Ön, a 1966 Swedish film
 On (Japanese prosody), the counting of sound units in Japanese poetry
 On (novel), by Adam Roberts
 ONdigital, a failed British digital television service, later called ITV Digital
 Overmyer Network, a former US television network

Places
 On (Ancient Egypt), a Hebrew form of the ancient Egyptian name of Heliopolis
 On, Wallonia, a district of the municipality of Marche-en-Famenne
 Ahn, Luxembourg, known in Luxembourgish as On
 Ontario, a Canadian province

Science, technology, and mathematics

Biology and medicine
 Operative note, documentation of care relating to an operation
 Optic neuritis, especially relevant in multiple sclerosis
 Osteonecrosis, death of bone tissue
 Osteonectin, a glycoprotein

Other uses in science, technology, and mathematics
 ON Semiconductor, a semiconductor manufacturing company
 O'Nan group, a mathematical group
 OS/Net, the OpenSolaris Community
 On, the proper class of all ordinal numbers

Other uses
 On (biblical figure), son of Peleth
 On (company), a Swiss athletic shoe and sportswear company
 On Kawara, Japanese artist
 Nauru Airlines (IATA airline designator ON)
 Leg side, in the game of cricket
 Old Norse, a North Germanic language commonly referenced in etymology
 Ontology, a branch of philosophy that deals with the concept of being
 On'yomi, reading of Japanese kanji characters
 Order of the Nation, a Jamaican honour
 Overground Network, a railway scheme in South London
 ON convoys, a series of WWII trade convoys
 Orka náttúrunnar (ON Power), Icelandic geothermal power company

See also
 Yōon